The 1990 Grand Prix Passing Shot, also known as the Bordeaux Open, was a men's tennis tournament played on outdoor clay courts at Villa Primrose in Bordeaux, France that was part of the World Series of the 1990 ATP Tour. It was the 13th edition of the tournament and was held from 10 September until 16 September 1990. Fourth-seeded Guy Forget won the singles title.

Finals

Singles

 Guy Forget defeated  Goran Ivanišević 6–4, 6–3
 It was Forget's 1st singles title of the year and the 3rd of his career.

Doubles
 Tomás Carbonell /  Libor Pimek defeated  Mansour Bahrami /  Yannick Noah 6–3, 6–7, 6–2

References

External links
 ITF tournament edition details

Grand Prix Passing Shot
ATP Bordeaux
Grand Prix Passing Shot
Grand Prix Passing Shot